Harlin Quist (died May 13, 2000, age 69) born Harlin Bloomquist was a publisher noted for innovative children's books.

Early years
Harlin was born and raised in Virginia, Minnesota, attended Carnegie Tech and began his career in 1958 as an off-Broadway actor and producer.  His 1959 production of Chekhov's Ivanov won four Obie awards.  He also worked at Crowell-Collier and Dell Publishing until striking out on his own by establishing his own company, Harlin Quist, Inc., in 1965.

Career
Harlin Quist Books published over sixty children's books between 1966 and 1984 in the US and through a partnership in France. He gave the start to some notable authors and illustrators, including Guillermo Mordillo, Albert Cullum, Guy Billout, Nicole Claveloux, and Patrick Couratin. These books were praised for their wild, psychedelic illustrations and plots. In 1981, he won a National Book Award for cover design.

In the 1980s, he returned to theater and rehabilitated the NorShor Theatre, an Art Deco movie theater in Duluth, Minnesota.

In the 1990s Quist published books in France, where he spent most of his time. He established a company in Paris with French designer and illustrator Patrick Couratin and they reissued limited editions of some of his best-known books as well as publishing new ones for European distribution. Quist received an award from the French government for his achievements as a book publisher in Europe.

In 1994 he became ill with Myasthenia gravis.

Quist was survived by his three siblings.

See also

References

Children's book publishers
American book publishers (people)
Obie Award recipients
National Book Award winners
Carnegie Mellon University alumni
People from Virginia, Minnesota
2000 deaths